Joseph Blell is a politician from the opposition Sierra Leone People's Party. He served as Sierra Leone's High commissioner to Nigeria from 1993 to 2002. He was also Sierra Leone's Deputy Minister of Défense from 2002 until 2007. He is a Sierra Leonean.

He entered the Military School, Juba Barracks, Freetown from 1961-1966. He is the President of the African Centre for Strategic Studies, Chapter 29(2011-2015).

Blell was the Deputy Minister of Defence from 2002-2007 (President Tejan-Kabbah was the Substantive Minister). Blell, the de facto Minister, was the Pivot of the Restructuring Programme of the Republic of Sierra Leone Armed Forces. The Armed Forces had been decimated by the Rebel War, was now a force to be reckoned with. It was during this period that the Armed Forces were reduced from a war-time high of over 20,000 to just over 8000 at present. Before that he served as Sierra Leone High Commissioner to Federal Republic of Nigeria and accredited to several counties: Ghana, Benin, Togo, Equatorial Guinea and Republic of Congo. Blell was also accredited to the Economic Community of West African States (ECOWAS) from 1993 to 2002.

He was the Team Manager of the National Football Team (Leone Stars) that qualified for the African Cup of Nations in 1994 (Tunisia) and won the African Zone II Football Trophy for the first time in December 1993. Prior to his appointment as the Sierra Leone High Commissioner to the Federal Republic of Nigeria, he was the Regional Director of the Canadian University Service Overseas (CUSO) to Nigeria based in Kano and later Kaduna in Northern Nigeria. 1979-1985. His main area of responsibility was mainly the former Northern Eastern States of Borno, Bauchi and Gongola States. In 2020, he was appointed Chairman and Commissioner of the National Telecommunications Commission of Sierra Leone.

Personal
He is the father of Nigerian-Sierra Leonian singer/song writer Di'Ja

References

External links
http://news.sl/drwebsite/publish/article_20051610.shtml
http://news.sl/drwebsite/publish/article_2005501.shtml

Year of birth missing (living people)
Living people
Sierra Leonean military personnel
Sierra Leone People's Party politicians
Sierra Leonean diplomats
Sierra Leonean people of Lebanese descent
High Commissioners of Sierra Leone to Ghana
High Commissioners of Sierra Leone to Nigeria
Ambassadors of Sierra Leone to Benin
Ambassadors of Sierra Leone to Equatorial Guinea
Ambassadors of Sierra Leone to the Republic of the Congo
Ambassadors of Sierra Leone to Togo